John Edwin Canaday (February 1, 1907 – July 19, 1985) was a leading American art critic, author and art historian.

Early life and education
John Canaday was born in Fort Scott, Kansas, to Franklin and Agnes F. (Musson) Canaday. His family moved to Dallas when Canaday was seven and later moved to San Antonio, where he attended Main Avenue High School.

Canaday entered the University of Texas in 1924 and earned a B.A. degree in French and English literature in 1929. He subsequently studied painting and art history at Yale University, where he received an M.A. in 1933.

He taught at Washburn University of Topeka in 1933–34; at Newcomb College, Tulane University, New Orleans (1934–36); Hollins College, Roanoke, Virginia (1936–38); and the University of Virginia, Charlottesville (1938–50).

In 1943, he traveled to the Belgian Congo and acted as a French interpreter for the Bureau of Economic Welfare. The following year he joined the United States Marine Corps. He served as a lieutenant in an air-warning squadron in the Pacific until the end of World War II, after which he returned to the University of Virginia.

From 1950 to 1952, Canaday headed the art school at Newcomb College in New Orleans. He worked as chief of the educational division at the Philadelphia Museum of Art from 1953 to 1959. During this period he wrote the text for Metropolitan Seminars in Art, a widely distributed series of 24 portfolios published between 1958 and 1960 by the Metropolitan Museum of Art in New York City.

Newspaper career
In 1959, Canaday began a 17-year career as a leading art critic for The New York Times. In his first column on September 6, 1959, he inflamed the art establishment by proclaiming that Abstract Expressionism, the dominant style of the period, allowed "exceptional tolerance for incompetence and deception." Although he acknowledged the talent of the best Abstract Expressionists, he noted that "we have been had" by the "freaks, the charlatans, and the misled who surround this handful of serious and talented artists." Canaday's inaugural column and subsequent articles criticizing this style provoked a much-publicized letter to The New York Times signed by 49 of the nation's leading art figures, who denounced Canaday as an agitator. "I have trouble vis-à-vis Canaday," one artist wrote. "What he thinks of me, he can print, while what I think of him is unprintable." Other artists and critics, however, championed him as an honest and articulate observer of the art scene, which continued to provide ample targets for his barbed wit over the years.

Author
In addition to writing for the Times, Canaday published a number of influential books, notably Mainstreams of Modern Art: David to Picasso (1959), winner of the Athenaeum Literary Award and a popular art history textbook for many years. His experiences as a critic provided the subject matter of two books, Embattled Critic: Views on Modern Art (1962) and Culture Gulch: Notes on Art and Its Public in the 1960s (1969). He also wrote Keys to Art, with Katherine H. Canaday (1963), The Lives of the Painters (1969), Baroque Painters (1972), Late Gothic to Renaissance Painters (1972), Neoclassic to Post-Impressionist Painters (1972), My Best Girls: 8 Drawings (1972), The New York Guide to Dining Out in New York (1972), The Artful Avocado (1973), Richard Estes: The Urban Landscape (1979), What is Art? An Introduction to Painting, Sculpture, and Architecture (1980), and Ben Shahn, Voices and Visions (1981).

In the 1940s and 1950s, under the pen name Matthew Head, Canaday wrote seven crime novels: The Smell of Money (1943), The Devil in the Bush (1945), The Accomplice (1949), The Cabinda Affair (1949), The Congo Venus (1950), Another Man's Life (1953), and Murder at the Flea Club (1955), each originally published by Simon & Schuster of New York. Drawing in part on his experiences in the Congo, he set three of his mysteries in Africa, and they were heralded by one critic as subtly foreshadowing a time of change on the African continent.

In 1974, Canaday stepped down from his post as art critic in order to devote more time to writing books, although he continued to write restaurant reviews for the Times until his retirement in 1977. 

Canaday taught several courses as a guest lecturer at the University of Texas in the spring of 1977. He continued to lecture and to write for such publications as Smithsonian magazine, The New Republic, and The New York Times Magazine until his death.

Personal life and death
Canaday married Katherine S. Hoover on September 19, 1935, and they had two sons. He died of pancreatic cancer in New York City on July 19, 1985.

In popular culture
In the 2014 film Big Eyes, directed by Tim Burton, Canaday is portrayed by actor Terence Stamp, making derogatory comments on the paintings of Margaret Keane.

Notes
The New York Times, July 21, 1985.
The New Yorker, January 4, 1964.
Who's Who in America, 1984–85.

References

External links
 John Canaday Papers at Syracuse University Special Collections Research Center

1907 births
1985 deaths
20th-century American academics
20th-century American historians
20th-century American journalists
20th-century American male writers
20th-century American novelists
American art critics
American art historians
American crime fiction writers
American expatriates in the Belgian Congo
American male journalists
American magazine journalists
American male novelists
American newspaper journalists
American restaurant critics
Crime novelists
Critics employed by The New York Times
Deaths from cancer in New York (state)
Deaths from pancreatic cancer
Historians from Kansas
Historians from Louisiana
Historians from Texas
Hollins University faculty
Journalists from Dallas
Journalists from Kansas
Journalists from Louisiana
Journalists from San Antonio
Journalists from Virginia
 Military personnel from Dallas
Military personnel from Kansas
Military personnel from Louisiana
Military personnel from San Antonio
Military personnel from Virginia
Novelists from Kansas
 Novelists from Louisiana
Novelists from Texas
Novelists from Virginia
People associated with the Metropolitan Museum of Art
People associated with the Philadelphia Museum of Art
People from Fort Scott, Kansas
Tulane University faculty
United States Marine Corps officers
United States Marine Corps personnel of World War II
University of Texas alumni
University of Texas faculty
University of Virginia faculty
Washburn University faculty
Writers from Charlottesville, Virginia
Writers from New Orleans
Yale University alumni